Chamaita nubifera is a moth of the family Erebidae first described by George Hampson in 1918. It is found in the Philippines.

References

Nudariina
Moths described in 1918